Chüy Region is the northernmost region (oblast) of the Kyrgyz Republic. This region surrounds the national capital of Kyrgyzstan, Bishkek. It is bounded on the north by Kazakhstan, and clockwise, Issyk-Kul Region, Naryn Region, Jalal-Abad Region, and Talas Region. Its administrative center is Bishkek. The resident population of the region was 974,984 as of January 2021. The region has sizeable Russian (20.8% in 2009) and Dungan (6.2% in 2009) minorities. It takes its name from the river Chüy, that flows through the region.

History
In 1926, the area of the current region became part of the newly established Kirghiz ASSR. In 1939 the Frunze Region (oblast) was established. In 1959 Frunze Region was dissolved, and its constituent districts became districts of republican significance (not subordinated to a region). In 1990 the Chüy Region was established. From 2003 to 2006, its administrative center was Tokmok. 

During the Soviet period, various agro-processing and other industries were established throughout the province, giving rise to several urban centers such as Tokmok, Kant and Kara-Balta.

Geography 

The main northwest part of the region is flat, a rarity in Kyrgyzstan. This is the Chüy Valley, the valley of the river Chu (Chüy). The valley's black soil is fertile and largely irrigated with water diverted from the Chu. The region's Agricultural production includes wheat, maize, sugar beets, potatoes, lucerne, and various vegetables and fruits.

The Kyrgyz Ala-Too mountains form the southern border of the region and the northern border of the Talas Region. There are many hiking and trekking routes accessible from the towns in the valley. The southwestern heel of the region over the Kyrgyz Alatau is geographically more like Naryn Region.

The northeast panhandle is the Chong Kemin Valley.

Divisions

The Chüy Region is divided administratively into one city of regional significance (Tokmok), and eight districts:

Kant, Kara-Balta, Kayyngdy, Kemin, Orlovka and Shopokov are cities of district significance. There is one urban-type settlement in the region: Bordu (part of Kemin District).

The Chüy District surrounds the city of Tokmok. The Alamüdün District surrounds the city of Bishkek, which however is not part of Chüy Region but a region-level administrative unit in its own right. The southwestern heel is administered as two exclaves of Jayyl and Panfilov Districts, Panfilov having a valley to the southeast and Jayyl the mountains to the north, west and southwest.

Economy
The economically active population of Chüy Region in 2009 was 349,921, of which 297,298 employed and 52,632 (15.0%) unemployed. 

Agricultural production includes wheat, maize, sugar beets, potatoes, lucerne, and various vegetables and fruits. There is little industry in the region.

 Export: 294.3 million US dollars (2009)
 Import: 202.5 million US dollars (2009)
 Direct Foreign Investments (2009): 57 million US dollars

Transport
The main east-west transportation axis of the region is the Taraz-Bishkek-Balykchy highway, running through most major cities of the region. This road's section west of Bishkek is part of European route E40, known locally as Highway M-39 (based on the old USSR highway numbering scheme). The same numbers apply to the road that continues north-east from Bishkek toward Almaty, crossing the river Chüy and leaving the region for Kazakhstan at Korday border crossing.

The only railway in the region runs along the same Taraz-Bishkek-Balykchy route; it sees comparatively little use these days.

Demographics
The resident population of Chüy Region, according to the Population and Housing Census of 2009, was 803,230. The Region's estimated population was at 974,984 in the beginning of 2021.

Ethnic composition
The population is considerably more heterogeneous than that of the other regions of the country, with many ethnic Russians, Ukrainians, Dungans, Koreans, Germans, etc.

According to the 2009 Census, the ethnic composition (de jure population) of Chüy Region was:

Notable People 

 Dzhokhar Tsarnaev, Kyrgyz-American terrorist responsible for the Boston Marathon bombing.

Gallery

References

External links 

  

Chüy Region
Regions of Kyrgyzstan